Anisimovka is a rural locality (a village) in Myaksinskoye Rural Settlement, Cherepovetsky District, Vologda Oblast, Russia. The population was 5 as of 2002.

Geography 
Dor is the nearest rural locality.

References 

Rural localities in Cherepovetsky District